Aaron Eugene Fletcher (born February 25, 1996) is an American professional baseball pitcher in the San Francisco Giants organization. He played college baseball for the University of Houston. Fletcher was drafted by the Washington Nationals in the 14th round of the 2018 MLB draft. He previously played in MLB for the Seattle Mariners and Pittsburgh Pirates.

Early years
Fletcher attended Langham Creek High School in Houston, Texas. He attended the University of Houston and played college baseball for the Cougars. Fletcher underwent Tommy John surgery on March 11, 2016. in 2018 after going 7-3 with a 2.19 ERA in 94.1 innings, Fletcher was named the AAC 2018 Pitcher of the Year.

Career

Washington Nationals
Fletcher was drafted by the Washington Nationals in the 14th round, with the 431st overall selection, of the 2018 MLB draft. In 2018, he played for the Gulf Coast Nationals and the Auburn Doubledays, going 2–1 with a 2.90 ERA in 31 innings. He pitched for the Hagerstown Suns, Potomac Nationals, and Harrisburg Senators in the Washington organization in 2019, going a combined 5–4 with a 1.79 ERA in 60 innings.

Seattle Mariners
On July 31, 2019, the Nationals traded Fletcher, Taylor Guilbeau, and Elvis Alvarado to the Seattle Mariners in exchange for Roenis Elías and Hunter Strickland. He was assigned to the Arkansas Travelers, compiling a 3.46 ERA over 13 innings. Fletcher played for the Peoria Javelinas of the Arizona Fall League following the 2019 season, and was named a Fall League All-Star. 

Fletcher had his contract selected to the active roster on August 21, 2020. He made his major league debut the next day, throwing a scoreless inning in relief against the Texas Rangers. In 2020, he pitched 4.1 innings for the Mariners.

Pittsburgh Pirates
On March 13, 2022, Fletcher was claimed off waivers by the Pittsburgh Pirates. On July 8, 2022, Fletcher was designated for assignment.

San Francisco Giants
On July 14, 2022, Fletcher was claimed off waivers by the San Francisco Giants. He was sent outright off the 40-man roster on July 18, 2022.

References

External links

1996 births
Living people
People from Geneseo, Illinois
Baseball players from Illinois
Major League Baseball pitchers
Seattle Mariners players
Pittsburgh Pirates players
Houston Cougars baseball players
Gulf Coast Nationals players
Auburn Doubledays players
Hagerstown Suns players
Potomac Nationals players
Harrisburg Senators players
Arkansas Travelers players
Peoria Javelinas players
Tacoma Rainiers players